Kool Herc: Fertile Crescent is an EP by American rapper Homeboy Sandman. It was released by Stones Throw Records in 2013. Music videos were created for "Peace & Love" and "Men Are Mortal".

Critical reception

At Metacritic, which assigns a weighted average score out of 100 to reviews from mainstream critics, the EP received an average score of 85, based on 5 reviews, indicating "universal acclaim".

Spin placed it at number 35 on the "Best Hip-Hop Albums of 2013" list. HipHopDX included it in the "Top 25 Albums of 2013" list.

Track listing

Personnel
Credits adapted from liner notes.

 Homeboy Sandman – vocals
 El RNTC – production
 Dave Dar – engineering
 Jeff Jank – art direction
 Tyke Witness AWR – artwork

References

External links
 

2013 EPs
Stones Throw Records EPs
Homeboy Sandman albums